John H. Callahan (January 25, 1845 – March 13, 1914) was one of two men from the 122nd Illinois Volunteer Infantry Regiment to receive the Medal of Honor during the American Civil War. Callahan was a private in Company B.  The medal was awarded for capturing a Confederate flag during the Battle of Fort Blakely on April 9, 1865; he was one of fourteen men awarded with the Medal of Honor at this battle.

Callahan joined the Army in August 1862, and was mustered out in July 1865.

He died on March 13, 1914, in Manhattan, Kansas and is buried in Sunset Cemetery.

Medal of Honor citation

Rank and organization. Private, Company B, 122nd Illinois Infantry. Place and date: At Fort Blakely, Ala., 9 April 1865. Entered service at : Macoupin County, Ill. Birth: Shelby County, Ky. Date of issue: 8 June 1865.

Citation:

Capture of flag.

See also

List of Medal of Honor recipients
List of American Civil War Medal of Honor recipients: A–F

References

1845 births
1914 deaths
People from Shelby County, Kentucky
United States Army Medal of Honor recipients
People of Illinois in the American Civil War
Union Army soldiers
American Civil War recipients of the Medal of Honor